HMS Pouncer was the mercantile David, launched in 1785 at Leith, that the Admiralty purchased and armed in 1797 as GB No.38. David originally sailed to the Baltic and then to the Mediterranean. From 1793 or so till her sale to the Admiralty she sailed as a transport under contract to the Transport Board. The Navy renamed GB No.38 HMS Pouncer, and she was the only naval vessel ever to bear that name. The Navy sold Pouncer in 1802 following the Peace of Amiens. She then returned to mercantile service as the West Indiaman David. Under several masters and owners she traded more widely. In 1816 she sank, but was recovered.

David
David first appeared in Lloyd's Register (LR) in 1786, the volume for 1785 not being available online.

Her owners sold David to the Admiralty in March 1797 at Leith.

HMS Pouncer
The Navy took David in as GB No.38 and she underwent fitting at Leith between March and 20 August 1797.

Lieutenant George B. Smith commissioned GB No.38 in May 1797, for the North Sea. She became Pouncer on 7 August 1797.

On 9 December 1800, the French privateer Victoire, of 14 guns and 60 men, sailing out of Dunkirk, captured the sloop Lamb, of Boston in Lancashire, off  Flamborough Head. Pouncer recaptured Lamb the same day and sent her into Leith. The privateer had also captured two light colliers.

In May 1801 Lieutenant John Clements replaced Smith in Yarmouth roads. Smith returned to command of Pouncer in December 1801.

Disposal: The "Principal Officers and Commissioners of His Majesty's Navy" offered the "Pouncer Gun-Vessel, 165 tons,...lying at Sheerness", for sale on 9 September 1802.

David
David, of 170 tons (bm), built in Leith in 1785, reappeared in the Register of Shipping (RS), in 1805. She was sailing as a West Indiaman, after having been raised and having received a new deck in 1803. Her master was R. Graves, and her owner as Robertson.

On 4 May 1812, David, Taylor, master, put into Grenada leaky. She had been on her way from Berbice to London.  Part of her cargo had been unloaded, which enabled the leak to be stopped. It was expected that she would sail in a few days. She arrived at Gravesend, Kent on 10 August.

In November 1816, Lloyd's List reported that as David, Colburn, master, was coming into Calais while on a voyage from  Memel, Prussia to Cowes, she struck on the bar. She unshipped her rudder, and having received considerable damage, sank. David was recovered and repaired.

Citations

References
 

1785 ships
Age of Sail merchant ships of England
Brigs of the Royal Navy